The Rainkopf  is one of the highest summits of the Vosges Mountains. It is located on the border between the French regions of Alsace and Lorraine. Not faraway from its summit is located a mountain hut called Refuge "Louis Hergès" au Rainkopf

Etymology 
In German Rainkopf means ravine mountain.

Geography 
The mountain is divided between the French municipalities of La Bresse (dep. of Vosges, Lorraine), Mittlach and Wildenstein (dep. of Haut-Rhin, Alsace).

The well known Route des Crêtes (French for road of the peaks) transits not faraway from the top of the mountain, which can be reached by a foothpath signposted by the Vosges Club.

See also 
 Vosges Mountains

References 

Mountains of Haut-Rhin
Mountains of Vosges (department)
One-thousanders of France
Mountains of the Vosges